Traditional Irish singing is the singing of traditional songs in the native styles such as sean nós. Though some people consider sean nós to particularly refer to singing in the Irish language, the term 'traditional singing' is more universally understood to encompass singing in any language, as well as lilting. 

Some of the characteristics of traditional Irish songs might be
 Solo singing
 Unaccompanied
 Unamplified
 The audience is focused on the singing

In contrast, Irish ballad singing might be thought of as differing in several respects, even if it is also sometimes referred to as 'traditional'. 
 Ballad singing is almost always accompanied by musical instruments.
 It is most often a group activity, not solo singing.
 It is performed typically in public areas, the singing is usually amplified, and the performance might be secondary (e.g. as background music in a pub).

Source singers
The term ‘source singer’ is generally understood to describe a singers in the past who received their style and repertoire through the oral tradition, whether that be through a family lineage or social circumstance. In the past, many such 'source' singers were deemed so upon ‘discovery’ by field researches such as Cecil Sharp, Alan Lomax, Hamish Henderson, Pete Seeger, Ewan MacColl or other song collectors who were prominent in 1950s and 1960s.  Although far from precise, the phrase sometimes was used to draw a distinction with so-called ‘revival’ singers, whose style and repertoire were perceived as adulterated by contact with written and other second-hand sources. The distinction today in the 21st century is harder to draw.

See also
 List of traditional Irish singers
 Lilting
 Sean-nós singing
 Sean Nós and Sean-nós Activities
 Irish dance

Irish styles of music
Irish music